Chung Hyeon was the defending champion but chose not to defend his title.

Evgeny Donskoy won the title after defeating Marius Copil 7–6(7–0), 7–5 in the final.

Seeds

Draw

Finals

Top half

Bottom half

References
Main Draw
Qualifying Draw

OEC Kaohsiung - Singles
2017 Singles